= E. & D. Kinsey =

E. & D. Kinsey were American silversmiths active from 1844 to 1861. The brothers ran the most successful Cincinnati-based silversmith partnership in that city's booming industrial pre-Civil War period. The flatware and hollow ware they produced are now prized as fine works of art and as such are shown in the Decorative Arts collection at the Cincinnati Art Museum.

Edward, the older brother, was born in Wales in 1810. David was born 18 Oct 1819 in Wales. Edward apprenticed to his father Thomas Kinsey about 1823. He started working in Cincinnati about 1830 and worked as a Silversmith until his death in 1865. Edward acted as Master Silversmith for his brother David. David died in Cincinnati, Ohio, 30 Mar 1874. The brothers are listed as silversmiths in the 1850 Census at Cincinnati.

Edward Kinsey lived first in Newport, Kentucky, moved to Cincinnati, and by 1836 had his own silver factory, employing many other silversmiths and producing both flatware and hollow ware. By 1844 Edward was working with his brother David. The used the Mark "E&D Kinsey". The Kinsey brothers wholesaled a great deal of silver in Kentucky and Ohio through retailers in those states.
